Red Tree is a multi-disciplinary artists' collective founded in Toronto in 1989.
Founding Members: Amanda K. Hale (theatre), Lynn Hutchinson (visual art) and Georgia Watterson (literature).

Collective Creation and Community Art Practice:
Red Tree works in interdisciplinary and cross-cultural collaboration with artists and/or community members. Cultural workers, activists and community workers are co-authors in creation and presentation of artistic production. Community art collaborations are driven by specific cultural practices or community issues and are guided by principles of participatory research. Red Tree positions inclusive and collective process against disciplinary canons. Red Tree Homepage 

Red Tree has received peer-reviewed grants from Canada Council, Ontario Arts Council, Toronto Arts Council, as well as support from foundations and governments. In 2015, the City of Hamilton supported the production and installation of a series of art banners connecting arts audiences and soccer fans in conjunction with the PanAm soccer games. Participating artists June Pak, Sadko Hadzihasanovic, Shelley Niro, Fiona Kinsella, Amelia Jiménez and Klyde Broox were part of a larger program in collaboration with Centre3 for Print and Media Arts 

Current Members
Toronto: Lynn Hutchinson, Dr. Asselin Charles, Amelia Jiménez[2], Neri Espinoza, and 
Hamilton: Klyde Broox[3], Ingrid Mayrhofer and Amanda Lemus

Guest artists: Shelley Niro | Sally Frater | Raffael Iglesias |Sady Ducros | Beatriz Pizano | Margo Charlton | Samina Mansuri | Claire Carew |Hannah Claus | John Donoghue | Ronald Lee | Ron Edding | Spin | Adrienne Reynolds | Sadko Hadzihasanovic | Vince Pietrapaolo | Jamelie Hassan | Ron Benner | Antonio Mendoza | Jorge Lozano | Anne Marie Beneteau | Dámarys Sepúlveda | Daniel David Moses | Leonarda Reyes | Nuno Cristo | Aida Jordão | Maria Ramirez |Marcel Commanda | Miguel Lima | Nazeer Khan | Nano Valverde | Penny McCabe | Augusto Crespín | Don Bouzek | Rodrigo Chavez | Fernando Hernandez | Larry Towell | Monique Mojica | Billy Merasty| shannon crossman| SAMINA MANSURI | René FRANCISCO | BRYCE KANBARA | PETER KARUNA | DELIO DELGADO | ANDREW McPHAIL
... and more

Project chronology 

 2015 – ArtMatch banners
 2011/12 – of food and form part 2  Dishing  Part 1 with Amelia Jiménez, Samina Mansuri, Shannon Crossman, Ingrid Mayrhofer
 2010/2011 – Canada without shadows/ kanada Bizo uchalipe 
 2010 – Scouring City, Brushing Sky
 2009 – ReMix  (The Cuban Exchange Project) including Popeye's Golden Theory
 2008 – Un Sólo Cielo/Under a Single Sky 
 2007/8 – Shukar Lulugi (Beautiful Flower)
 2007 – From One Place To Another: Las Dos Realidades
 2005 – LOKI GILI/Song of Sorrow, Song of Hope
 2002–2003 ART/BOOKS ON THE FENCE/Libros al limite
 2001 – ENCHANTED STONES
 2000 – GREETING TO TANIPERLA 
 1999 – NUNCA MAS/Never Again
 1999 – BIRDS OF A FEATHER
 1998 – STRATEGIES AROUND VIOLENCE
 1997 – EAT OR BE EATEN
 1992–1994 – THE RIVER OF BLOOD FLOWS ON
 1989–1992 – THE MOUNTAINS ARE BREATHING

References

Canadian artist groups and collectives